Volver a vivir is a 1941 Argentine film.

Cast
 Diana Adhemar		
 Pedro Beco		
 José Castroler		
 Héctor Coire		
 Aída Fernández		
 Rene Fischer Bauer		
 Domingo Froid		
 Rafael Frontaura		
 Niní Gambier		
 Carmen Giménez		
 Alberto Giralde		
 Miguel Inclán		
 Antonio Lagrosa		
 Pancho López (actor)		
 Claudio Martino

External links
 

1941 films
1940s Spanish-language films
Argentine black-and-white films
1940s Argentine films